Arthur Cowell (20 May 1886 – 12 February 1959) was an English international footballer who played as a left back.

Career
Born in Blackburn, Cowell started his career in amateur football with Blackburn St Peter's and Nelson. He then played professionally for Blackburn Rovers, making 280 appearances in the Football League for the club between 1905 and 1920. He earned one cap for England in 1910. During the 1915–16 season, Cowell played as a guest in five wartime fixtures for Burnley.

References

1886 births
1959 deaths
English footballers
England international footballers
Nelson F.C. players
Blackburn Rovers F.C. players
English Football League players
Burnley F.C. wartime guest players
English Football League representative players
Association football fullbacks